Rhizopogon occidentalis is a truffle-like fungus in the family Rhizopogonaceae. It is found in western North America, where it grows in coastal dunes and montane forests with two-needle and three-needle pines. The fungus was described as new to science in 1918 by mycologists Sanford Myron Zeller and Carroll William Dodge. The whitish to yellow outer surface of the fruit body stains reddish after bruising or other injury. The gleba is pale, darkening and drying with age. Its spores are smooth, ellipsoid, and measure 5.5–7 by 2–3 μm. Accounts differ as to the edibility of the fungus; one source says it is inedible, while another says it is edible with a mild odor and taste.

References

External links

Fungi of North America
Rhizopogonaceae
Fungi described in 1918